Georgy Petrovich Egorychev (or Yegorychev) (Георгий Петрович Егорычев, born 1938) is a Russian mathematician, known for the Egorychev method.

Biography 

He graduated in mathematics from Ural State University and in 1960 became a teacher of mathematics in secondary school.

In 1982 G. P. Egorychev and D. I. Falikman shared the Fulkerson Prize for (independently) proving van der Waerden's conjecture that the matrix with all entries equal has the smallest permanent of any doubly stochastic matrix. Egorychev is now a professor in the Department of Mathematical Support of Discrete Devices and Systems, Institute of Mathematics and Fundamental Informatics at Siberian Federal University (Russian abbreviation is SFU, SibFU, or СФУ), founded in 2006.

He was an Invited Speaker of the ICM in 1986 in Berkeley, California. He was awarded a Scholarship of the President of Russia in 1994–1996 and again in 1997–2000.

Research 
His research deals with combinatorial analysis, multidimensional complex analysis, and algorithms of integral representation and calculation of combinatorial sums and their applications in various fields of mathematics and science. In particular, his research has applied the Egorychev method to the basis of tensor calculus and to the theory of matrix functions, including permanents and determinants over various algebraic systems. He has published over 80 articles.

Selected publications
Егорычев Г.П. (2013). Новое семейство полиномиальных тождеств для вычисления детерминантов. Доклады Академии Наук, т. 452, No.1, с. 1–3. (A new family of polynomial identities for the calculation of determinants. Reports of the Academy of Sciences, vol. 452, No. 1, p. 1–3.)
Egorychev G.P. (2009). Method of coefficients: an algebraic characterization and recent applications. Springer, Adv. in Combin. Math.; Math. Proc. of the Waterloo Workshop in Computer Algebra 2008, devoted to the 70th birthday of G. Egorychev, pp. 1–30.
Egorychev G.P. and Zima E.V. (2008). Integral representation and Algorithms for closed form summation. Handbook of Algebra, vol. 5, ed. M. Hazewinkel, Elsevier, pp. 459–529.
Егорычев Г.П. (2008). Дискретная математика. Перманенты. Учебное пособие. Красноярский государственный университет, Красноярск. 272 стр. (Discrete Math. Permanent. Tutorial. Krasnoyarsk State University, Krasnoyarsk. 272 pp.)

References

1938 births
Living people
20th-century Russian mathematicians
21st-century Russian mathematicians
Ural State University alumni